The Roth–Steyr M1907, or, more accurately Roth-Krnka M.7 was a semi-automatic pistol issued to the Austro-Hungarian kaiserliche und königliche Armee cavalry during World War I.  It was the first adoption of a semi-automatic service pistol by the land army of a major power.

Mechanism 
The Roth–Steyr pistol fires from an unusual style of locked breech. The bolt is very long. Its rear end is solid, except for a sleeve for the striker, but its front part is hollow and fits tightly over the barrel. The interior of the bolt has cam grooves cut into it, and the barrel has studs which fit into the grooves. When the pistol is fired, the barrel and bolt recoil together within the hollow receiver for about 0.5 inch. During this operation, the helical grooves in the muzzle bush cause the barrel to turn 90 degrees clockwise, after which it is held while the unlocked bolt continues to the rear, cocking the action as it does so.  For safety in the intended use by mounted cavalry, the pistol has a heavy trigger pull against the firing striker spring, similar to a hammerless revolver.

The Roth–Steyr is a locked-breech pistol, which allows the barrel and bolt to recoil together within a hollow receiver.  It is chambered for a cartridge specific to this model. The Roth–Steyr does not have a detachable magazine, but features a fixed magazine loaded from the top with stripper clips. The sights are fixed, the grips are wooden and terminate in a lanyard ring.  Rifling is four grooves with right-hand twist.

Production and distribution 
The pistol was developed by the Czech designer , working for the ammunition company of Georg Roth, based on the earlier Roth–Theodorovic pistol. After development and tests of several prototypes, the final version of the Roth–Krnka won a contest for an Army pistol in 1906, and was adapted as a standard gun of Austro-Hungarian Army as: Repetierpistole M.7. (self-loading pistol M1907). Since Roth had no weapon production capabilities, the government bought all the rights and ordered production in the Österreichische Waffenfabriksgesellschaft (OEWG) in Steyr and FEG in Budapest. From 1908 to 1914, approximately 99,000 weapons were manufactured (the Army received 59,334 from Steyr and 38,213 from FEG, plus several hundred were sold on the civilian market). Despite common name for the pistol Roth–Steyr, Steyr works did not participate in its design, apart from minor improvements. Following the dissolution of Austria-Hungary, the Roth–Steyr was fielded by Yugoslavia, with limited use during World War II by the Austrians and Hungarians.  Italy received a number of pistols as World War I reparations from Austria-Hungary, and these pistols were used by Italian troops during World War II. They were used also in Czechoslovakia and Poland.

Time Table 

*not to be confused with ACP

The UK & US Trials 
The company was looking forward to get a military contract for their brand new gun. The pistol was originally chambered for 8x18 mm Roth Steyr however the UK and US asked for a gun that would use a bigger cartridge, most preferably a 0.45 Cal.

UK 
The trials are exhaustively described in the Minutes of the Small Arms Committee, starting in April 1900 with the Borchardt and ending with the adoption of the .455SL Webley in 1912.

The first trial of the 11.35mm Roth is recorded in Minute 635 of June 1902. An 8mm Roth had been tested earlier in October 1900. In 1902 Roth submitted two 11.35mm and one 8mm pistol of “improved design”. The committee reported that the ammunition had a bullet of 198 grains with a copper envelope with exposed lead tip with 5 grains powder.

In March 1903 another Roth pistol was tested (Minute 745), this time in “.44 inch caliber” with a bullet of 247 grains which gave a velocity of 975 fps. The conclusion was that the method of loading was unsatisfactory, pull-off too heavy, too many openings to admit dust but Figure of Merit was good.

The last mention of a Roth is Minute 1077 of May 1909 when an 11mm (.403 inch actual) pistol, described as a “Mark II”, was tested. Recorded as having an eight round magazine loaded by charger. Velocity was 816.8 fps and penetration 10 half inch boards spaced one inch apart at 25 feet. Bullets weighed 200 grains with steel envelope and 4.7 grains of smokeless powder.

Conclusions were that it was a handy and well balanced pistol with good certainty of action. It performed well in the sand test, strips easily and had less recoil that the Webley pistol. There was no safety catch which was a disadvantage.

US 
A prototype in 10.3 mm cartridge was tested at the Springfield and it failed the 1,250 rounds endurance test with 191 malfunctions of 9 different types and broken extractor.

See also
 8mm Roth–Steyr
 8 mm caliber
 List of handgun cartridges

References

Further reading
  Karl R. Pawlas, "Pistole Roth-Steyr, Modell 1907 und ihre Vorläufer", Waffen Revue nr. 2, September 1971, pp. 237–264.
(In German) Vom Ursprung der Selbstladepistole By Josef Mötz, Joschi Schuy, 2007

External links

 http://www.google.com/patents/US616260
 http://www.google.com/patents/US616261
 PISTOL, SEMI-AUTOMATIC -  AUSTRIAN PISTOL M07 "ROTH-STEYR" 8MM SN# 13858 - Springfield Armory Museum
 

 

8 mm firearms
Semi-automatic pistols 1901–1909
Semi-automatic pistols of Austria
World War I Austro-Hungarian infantry weapons
Fegyver- és Gépgyár firearms